Joe Yeninas (May 10, 1934 – May 29, 2020) was an American cartoonist and illustrator for the Newark Evening News, the Associated Press, and The Journal of Commerce.

Yeninas lived in Holmdel Township, New Jersey since the mid-1990s, having moved there from North Caldwell, New Jersey.

References

1934 births
2020 deaths
American cartoonists
People from Holmdel Township, New Jersey
People from North Caldwell, New Jersey